Renato Buso (born 19 December 1969) is an Italian professional football coach and a former player who was deployed as a forward or as a midfielder.

Club career
Born in Treviso, Buso initially began his career playing as a striker or as a centre-forward with Juventus in Serie A in 1985, at the age of 16, immediately winning the 1985–86 Serie A title and the 1985 Intercontinental Cup, although he was mainly a reserve player at the club, behind forwards Aldo Serena, Ian Rush, and Alessandro Altobelli. He later moved to Fiorentina in 1989, where he was deployed alongside Roberto Baggio and Oscar Dertycia as a winger, or as a supporting striker. During his time at the club, he played and scored in the 1990 UEFA Cup Final against his former team, although Fiorentina would lose the tournament. He subsequently moved to Sampdoria in 1991, where he won the 1991 Supercoppa Italiana. He began to be deployed as a midfielder as his career progressed, and he later also played for Napoli (1993–1996), Lazio (1996–97), Piacenza (1997–2000), Cagliari (2000–01), ending his career with La Spezia in Serie C1 (2001–04).

International career
Buso has also represented Italy at youth level at the 1992 Summer Olympics, and at the 1992 UEFA European Under-21 Championship under Cesare Maldini, where he helped Italy to win the tournament, finishing as the top goalscorer, with 3 goals over the semi-final against Denmark, and the final against Sweden. In total, he made 5 appearances for Italy's Olympic Squad, and 25 appearances for the Under-21 side, scoring 9 goals.

Coaching career
On 17 November 2011, he became the new coach of Gavorrano in place of the sacked Guido Pagliuca. He was dismissed in April 2013, with Gavorrano in deep relegation zone under risk of leaving professional football, and replaced by Corrado Orrico.

Honours

Club
Juventus
 Serie A: 1985–86

Sampdoria
 Supercoppa Italiana: 1991

International
Italy U-21
 UEFA European Under-21 Football Championship: 1992

Individual
 UEFA European Under-21 Football Championship Top-scorer: 1992
 UEFA European Under-21 Football Championship Golden Player: 1992

References

External links
Renato Buso at Footballdatabase

1969 births
Living people
Italian footballers
Sportspeople from Treviso
Association football midfielders
Association football forwards
Serie A players
Serie B players
Serie C players
Italy under-21 international footballers
Footballers at the 1992 Summer Olympics
Juventus F.C. players
ACF Fiorentina players
U.C. Sampdoria players
S.S.C. Napoli players
S.S. Lazio players
Piacenza Calcio 1919 players
Cagliari Calcio players
Spezia Calcio players
Olympic footballers of Italy
Italian football managers
Calcio Montebelluna players
Footballers from Veneto